The uninhabited Cheyne Islands are members of the Queen Elizabeth Islands and the Arctic Archipelago in the Qikiqtaaluk Region of Nunavut, Canada. The group is made up of three islands known as North Island, Middle Island, and South Island.

Geography

Flora
Moss can be found growing on the Middle and South islands.

Fauna
They are a Canadian Important Bird Area (#NU049) and a Key Migratory Bird Terrestrial Habitat site (NU site 5). Notable bird species include Ross's gull and northern common eider.

References

External links
 Cheyne Islands in the Atlas of Canada - Toporama; Natural Resources Canada

Islands of Baffin Bay
Islands of the Queen Elizabeth Islands
Uninhabited islands of Qikiqtaaluk Region
Important Bird Areas of Qikiqtaaluk Region
Important Bird Areas of Arctic islands
Seabird colonies